The Arboretum de Font-Romeu (9 hectares) is an arboretum located at an altitude of 1800 metres within the Forêt de Font-Romeu near Font-Romeu-Odeillo-Via, Pyrénées-Orientales, Languedoc-Roussillon, France. It was established in 1938 and is managed by the Office National des Forêts.

See also 
 List of botanical gardens in France

References 
 L'Echo des Chênaies entry (French)
 Convention on Biological Diversity: Botanical Gardens in France
 CerdagneBlog entry (French)
 ONF photograph
 Pierre Mullenbach, Reboisements d'altitude, Editions Quae, 2001, page 291. .

Font-Romeu, Arboretum de
Font-Romeu, Arboretum de
1938 establishments in France